Reginald Theodore Carlos Hoidge MC & Bar (28 July 1894 – 1 March 1963) was a Canadian First World War flying ace, officially credited with 28 victories.  He served initially in the Canadian Royal Garrison Artillery before transferring to the British Army to be attached to the Royal Flying Corps, and then the new Royal Air Force on its creation in 1918.

Early life
Hoidge was born in Toronto, Ontario, Canada. He was the son of John R. and Lovida Hoidge. He originally served with the Canadian Royal Garrison Artillery.

Aerial service in combat
Hoidge transferred to the British Army, taking a commission in the (British) Royal Garrison Artillery (Special Reserve), and was attached to the Royal Flying Corps, as a second lieutenant on 15 November 1916. He was posted to No. 56 Squadron to fly a Royal Aircraft Factory SE 5 fighter in 1917. He flew this aircraft for all his victories.

His first victory was over an Albatros D.III on 5 May 1917. He sent it down out of control over Montigny, France. The first of three victories on 24 May made him an ace. In an evening hour's roving battle, he sent an Albatros D.II down out of control for score number five, set another German plane on fire for number six, and finished up the day by driving down another D.III as victim seven.

He was promoted to temporary lieutenant on 1 June 1917, and later confirmed in that rank from 11 July 1917. He was awarded the Military Cross on 18 July, the citation read:

On 22 August, he was appointed a flight commander, with the rank of temporary captain.

Hoidge continued downing enemy aircraft until 31 October 1917, when his total stood at 27. During this stretch of success, his most memorable battle was one in which he did not score. He was one of the seven aces involved in Werner Voss's last stand on 23 September, when Voss in his Fokker F.I fought all the British fliers to a standstill, damaging all the attacking SE 5s. Hoidge's final total included 23 successes over enemy fighters and only five over opposing two-seater reconnaissance planes.
His 28-claim tally comprised eight destroyed (including a shared victory), and 20 'out of control' victories (including two shared).

Later life
Hoidge was returned to England for a year's duty as an instructor. He was awarded a Bar to his MC on 18 March 1918, the citation read:

He returned to the front as a flight commander in his old unit and scored a final victory on 29 October 1918. He relinquished his commission on 1 April 1920, and was permitted to retain the rank of lieutenant. He died in New York City on 1 March 1963.

References

Notes

Citations
 British and Empire aces of World War I.Christopher Shores, Mark Rolfe. Osprey Publishing, 2001. , .

External links

Canadian aviators
Canadian World War I flying aces
Royal Flying Corps officers
People from Toronto
1894 births
1963 deaths
Royal Artillery officers
Canadian recipients of the Military Cross